The Ukrainian Soviet Socialist Republic, abbreviated as the Ukrainian SSR, UkrSSR, or UkSSR, and also known as Soviet Ukraine, was one of the constituent republics of the Soviet Union from 1922 until 1991. In the anthem of the Ukrainian SSR, it was referred to simply as Ukraine. Under the Soviet one-party model, the Ukrainian SSR was governed by the Communist Party of the Soviet Union through its republican branch, the Communist Party of Ukraine.

The first iterations of the Ukrainian SSR were established during the Russian Revolution, particularly after the Bolshevik Revolution. The outbreak of the Ukrainian–Soviet War in the former Russian Empire saw the Bolsheviks defeat the independent Ukrainian People's Republic, after which they founded the Ukrainian People's Republic of Soviets as a republic of the Russian Soviet Federative Socialist Republic in December 1917; it was later succeeded by the Ukrainian Soviet Republic in 1918, also under the Russian SFSR. Simultaneously with the Russian Civil War, the Ukrainian War of Independence was being fought among the different Ukrainian republics founded by Ukrainian nationalists, Ukrainian anarchists, and Ukrainian Bolsheviks—with either help or opposition from neighbouring states. As a Soviet quasi-state, the newly-established Ukrainian SSR became a founding member of the United Nations alongside the Byelorussian SSR, in spite of the fact that they were legally represented by the All-Union in foreign affairs. In 1922, it was one of four Soviet republics (with the Russian SFSR, the Byelorussian SSR, and the Transcaucasian SFSR) that signed the Treaty on the Creation of the Soviet Union. Upon the dissolution of the Soviet Union in 1991, the Ukrainian SSR emerged as the present-day independent state of Ukraine, although the Soviet constitution remained in use throughout the country until the adoption of the Ukrainian constitution in June 1996.

Throughout its 72-year history, the republic's borders changed many times, with a significant portion of what is now western Ukraine having been annexed from eastern Poland in 1939, with significant portions of Romania in 1940, alongside another addition of territory in 1945 from Carpathian Ruthenia in Czechoslovakia. From the 1919 establishment of the Ukrainian SSR until 1934, the city of Kharkov served as its capital; however, the republic's seat of government was subsequently relocated in 1934 to the city of Kiev, the historic Ukrainian capital, and remained at Kiev for the remainder of its existence.

Geographically, the Ukrainian SSR was situated in Eastern Europe, to the north of the Black Sea, and was bordered by the Soviet republics of Moldavia, Byelorussia, and Russia, and the countries of Romania, Hungary, Czechoslovakia, and Poland. The republic's border with Czechoslovakia formed the Soviet Union's westernmost border point. According to the 1989 Soviet census, the republic of Ukraine had a population of 51,706,746, which fell sharply after the Soviet Union's dissolution in 1991.

Name 

Its original name in 1919 was Ukrainian Socialist Soviet Republic (abbreviated ). After the ratification of the 1936 Soviet Constitution, the names of all Soviet republics were changed, transposing the second (socialist) and third (sovietskaya in Russian or radianska in Ukrainian) words. In accordance, on 5 December 1936, the 8th Extraordinary Congress Soviets in Soviet Union changed the name of the republic to the Ukrainian Soviet Socialist Republic, which was ratified by the 14th Extraordinary Congress of Soviets in Ukrainian SSR on 31 January 1937.

The name Ukraine is a subject of debate. It is often perceived as being derived from the Slavic word "okraina", meaning "border land". It was first used to define part of the territory of Kievan Rus' (Ruthenia) in the 12th century, at which point Kiev was the capital of Rus'. The name has been used in a variety of ways since the twelfth century. For example, Zaporozhian Cossacks called their hetmanate "Ukraine".

Within the Polish–Lithuanian Commonwealth, the name carried unofficial status for larger part of Kiev Voivodeship.

"The Ukraine" used to be the usual form in English, despite Ukrainian not having a definite article. Since the Declaration of Independence of Ukraine, this form has become less common in the English-speaking world, and style-guides warn against its use in professional writing. According to U.S. ambassador William Taylor, "The Ukraine" now implies disregard for the country's sovereignty. The Ukrainian position is that the usage of "'The Ukraine' is incorrect both grammatically and politically."

History 

After the abdication of the tsar and the start of the process of destruction of the Russian Empire many people in Ukraine wished to establish a Ukrainian Republic. During a period of civil war from 1917 to 1923 many factions claiming themselves governments of the newly born republic were formed, each with supporters and opponents. The two most prominent of them were a government in Kiev called the Ukrainian People's Republic (UNR) and a government in Kharkov called the Ukrainian Soviet Republic (USR). The Kiev-based UNR was internationally recognized and supported by the Central powers following the Treaty of Brest-Litovsk, whereas the Kharkov-based USR was solely supported by the Soviet Russian forces, while neither the UNR nor the USR were supported by the White Russian forces that remained.

The conflict between the two competing governments, known as the Ukrainian–Soviet War, was part of the ongoing Russian Civil War, as well as a struggle for national independence, which ended with the territory of pro-independence Ukrainian People's Republic being annexed into a new Ukrainian Socialist Soviet Republic, western Ukraine being annexed into the Second Polish Republic, and the newly stable Ukraine becoming a founding member of the Soviet Union.

The government of the Ukrainian Soviet Republic was founded on 24–25 December 1917. In its publications, it named itself either the Republic of Soviets of Workers', Soldiers' and Peasants' Deputies or the Ukrainian People's Republic of Soviets. The 1917 republic was only recognised by another non-recognised country, the Russian Soviet Federative Socialist Republic. With the signing of the Brest-Litovsk Treaty, it was ultimately defeated by mid-1918 and eventually dissolved. The last session of the government took place in the city of Taganrog.

In July 1918, the former members of the government formed the Communist Party (Bolsheviks) of Ukraine, the constituent assembly of which took place in Moscow. With the defeat of the Central Powers in World War I, Bolshevik Russia resumed its hostilities towards the Ukrainian People's Republic fighting for Ukrainian independence and organised another Soviet government in Kursk, Russia. On 10 March 1919, according to the 3rd Congress of Soviets in Ukraine (conducted 6–10 March 1919) the name of the state was changed to the Ukrainian Socialist Soviet Republic.

Founding: 1917–1922 
After the Russian Revolution of 1917, several factions sought to create an independent Ukrainian state, alternately cooperating and struggling against each other. Numerous more or less socialist-oriented factions participated in the formation of the Ukrainian People's Republic among which were Bolsheviks, Mensheviks, Socialists-Revolutionaries, and many others. The most popular faction was initially the local Socialist Revolutionary Party that composed the local government together with Federalists and Mensheviks.

Immediately after the October Revolution in Petrograd, Bolsheviks instigated the Kiev Bolshevik Uprising to support the Revolution and secure Kiev. Due to a lack of adequate support from the local population and anti-revolutionary Central Rada, however, the Kiev Bolshevik group split. Most moved to Kharkov and received the support of the eastern Ukrainian cities and industrial centers. Later, this move was regarded as a mistake by some of the People's Commissars (Yevgenia Bosch). They issued an ultimatum to the Central Rada on 17 December to recognise the Soviet government of which the Rada was very critical. The Bolsheviks convened a separate congress and declared the first Soviet Republic of Ukraine on 24 December 1917 claiming the Central Rada and its supporters outlaws that need to be eradicated. Warfare ensued against the Ukrainian People's Republic for the installation of the Soviet regime in the country and with the direct support from Soviet Russia the Ukrainian National forces were practically overrun. The government of Ukraine appealed to foreign capitalists, finding support in the face of the Central Powers as the others refused to recognise it. After the Treaty of Brest-Litovsk, the Russian SFSR yielded all the captured Ukrainian territory as the Bolsheviks were forced out of Ukraine. The government of Soviet Ukraine was dissolved after its last session on 20 November 1918.

After re-taking Kharkov in February 1919, a second Soviet Ukrainian government was formed. The government enforced Russian policies that did not adhere to local needs. A group of three thousand workers were dispatched from Russia to take grain from local farms to feed Russian cities and were met with resistance. The Ukrainian language was also censured from administrative and educational use. Eventually fighting both White forces in the east and republic forces in the west, Lenin ordered the liquidation of the second Soviet Ukrainian government in August 1919.

Eventually, after the creation of the Communist Party (Bolshevik) of Ukraine in Moscow, a third Ukrainian Soviet government was formed on 21 December 1919 that initiated new hostilities against Ukrainian nationalists as they lost their military support from the defeated Central Powers. Eventually, the Red Army ended up controlling much of the Ukrainian territory after the Polish-Soviet Peace of Riga. On 30 December 1922, along with the Russian, Byelorussian, and Transcaucasian republics, the Ukrainian SSR was one of the founding members of the Union of Soviet Socialist Republics (USSR).

Interwar years: 1922–1939 

During the 1920s, a policy of so-called Ukrainization was pursued in the Ukrainian SSR, as part of the general Soviet korenization policy; this involved promoting the use and the social status of the Ukrainian language and the elevation of ethnic Ukrainians to leadership positions (see Ukrainization - early years of Soviet Ukraine for more details).

In 1932, the aggressive agricultural policies of Joseph Stalin's regime resulted in one of the largest national catastrophes in the modern history for the Ukrainian nation. A famine known as the Holodomor caused a direct loss of human life estimated between 2.6 million to 10 million. Some scholars and the World Congress of Free Ukrainians assert that this was an act of genocide. The International Commission of Inquiry Into the 1932–1933 Famine in Ukraine found no evidence that the famine was part of a preconceived plan to starve Ukrainians, and concluded in 1990 that the famine was caused by a combination of factors, including Soviet policies of compulsory grain requisitions, forced collectivization, dekulakization, and Russification. The General Assembly of the UN has stopped shy of recognizing the Holodomor as genocide, calling it a "great tragedy" as a compromise between tense positions of United Kingdom, United States, Russia, and Ukraine on the matter, while many nations went on individually to accepted it as such.

World War II: 1939–1945 

In September 1939, the Soviet Union invaded Poland and occupied Galician lands inhabited by Ukrainians, Poles and Jews adding it to the territory of the Ukrainian SSR. In 1940, the Soviet Union occupied Bessarabia, Northern Bukovina and the Hertsa region, lands inhabited by Romanians, Ukrainians, Russians, Jews, Bulgarians and Gagauz, adding them to the territory of the Ukrainian SSR and the newly formed Moldavian SSR. In 1945, these lands were permanently annexed, and the Transcarpathia region was added as well, by treaty with the post-war administration of Czechoslovakia. Following eastward Soviet retreat in 1941, Ufa became the wartime seat of the Soviet Ukrainian government.

Post-war years: 1945–1953 
While World War II (called the Great Patriotic War by the Soviet government) did not end before May 1945, the Germans were driven out of Ukraine between February 1943 and October 1944. The first task of the Soviet authorities was to reestablish political control over the republic which had been entirely lost during the war. This was an immense task, considering the widespread human and material losses. During World War II the Soviet Union lost about 8.6 million combatants and around 18 million civilians, of these, 6.8 million were Ukrainian civilians and military personnel. Also, an estimated 3.9 million Ukrainians were evacuated to the Russian Soviet Federative Socialist Republic during the war, and 2.2 million Ukrainians were sent to forced labour camps by the Germans.

The material devastation was huge; Adolf Hitler's orders to create "a zone of annihilation" in 1943, coupled with the Soviet military's scorched-earth policy in 1941, meant Ukraine lay in ruins. These two policies led to the destruction of 28 thousand villages and 714 cities and towns. 85 percent of Kiev's city centre was destroyed, as was 70 percent of the city centre of the second-largest city in Ukraine, Kharkov. Because of this, 19 million people were left homeless after the war. The republic's industrial base, as so much else, was destroyed. The Soviet government had managed to evacuate 544 industrial enterprises between July and November 1941, but the rapid German advance led to the destruction or the partial destruction of 16,150 enterprises. 27,910 thousand collective farms, 1,300 machine tractor stations and 872 state farms were destroyed by the Germans.

While the war brought to Ukraine an enormous physical destruction, victory also led to territorial expansion. As a victor, the Soviet Union gained new prestige and more land. The Ukrainian border was expanded to the Curzon Line. Ukraine was also expanded southwards, near the area Izmail, previously part of Romania. An agreement was signed by the Soviet Union and Czechoslovakia whereby Carpathian Ruthenia was handed over to Ukraine.

After World War II, amendments to the Constitution of the Ukrainian SSR were accepted, which allowed it to act as a separate subject of international law in some cases and to a certain extent, remaining a part of the Soviet Union at the same time. In particular, these amendments allowed the Ukrainian SSR to become one of the founding members of the United Nations (UN) together with the Soviet Union and the Byelorussian SSR. This was part of a deal with the United States to ensure a degree of balance in the General Assembly, which, the USSR opined, was unbalanced in favor of the Western Bloc. In its capacity as a member of the UN, the Ukrainian SSR was an elected member of the United Nations Security Council in 1948–1949 and 1984–1985.

Khrushchev and Brezhnev: 1953–1985 

When Stalin died on 5 March 1953 the collective leadership of Khrushchev, Georgy Malenkov, Vyacheslav Molotov and Lavrentiy Beria took power and a period of de-Stalinization began. Change came as early as 1953, when officials were allowed to criticise Stalin's policy of russification. The Central Committee of the Communist Party of Ukraine (CPU) openly criticised Stalin's russification policies in a meeting in June 1953. On 4 June 1953, Aleksey Kirichenko succeeded Leonid Melnikov as First Secretary of the CPU; this was significant since Kyrychenko was the first ethnic Ukrainian to lead the CPU since the 1920s. The policy of de-Stalinization took two main features, that of centralisation and decentralisation from the centre. In February 1954 the Russian Soviet Federative Socialist Republic (RSFSR) transferred Crimea to Ukraine from the Russians; even if only 22 percent of the Crimean population were ethnic Ukrainian. 1954 also witnessed the massive state-organised celebration of the 300th anniversary of the Union Russia and Ukraine also known as the Pereyaslav Council; the treaty which brought Ukraine under Russian rule three centuries before. The event was celebrated to prove the old and brotherly love between Ukrainians and Russians, and proof of the Soviet Union as a "family of nations"; it was also another way of legitimising Marxism–Leninism. On 23 June 1954, the civilian oil tanker Tuapse of the Black Sea Shipping Company based in Odessa was hijacked by a fleet of Republic of China Navy in the high sea of 19°35′N, 120°39′E, west of Balintang Channel near Philippines, whereas the 49 Ukrainian, Russian and Moldovan crew were detained by the Kuomintang regime in various terms up to 34 years in captivity with 3 deaths.

The "Thaw"the policy of deliberate liberalisationwas characterised by four points: amnesty for all those convicted of state crime during the war or the immediate post-war years; amnesties for one-third of those convicted of state crime during Stalin's rule; the establishment of the first Ukrainian mission to the United Nations in 1958; and the steady increase of Ukrainians in the rank of the CPU and government of the Ukrainian SSR. Not only were the majority of CPU Central Committee and Politburo members ethnic Ukrainians, three-quarters of the highest ranking party and state officials were ethnic Ukrainians too. The policy of partial Ukrainisation also led to a cultural thaw within Ukraine.

In October 1964, Khrushchev was deposed by a joint Central Committee and Politburo plenum and succeeded by another collective leadership, this time led by Leonid Brezhnev, born in Ukraine, as First Secretary and Alexei Kosygin as Chairman of the Council of Ministers. Brezhnev's rule would be marked by social and economic stagnation, a period often referred to as the Era of Stagnation. The new regime introduced the policy of rastsvet, sblizhenie and sliianie ("flowering", "drawing together" and "merging"/"fusion"), which was the policy of uniting the different Soviet nationalities into one Soviet nationality by merging the best elements of each nationality into the new one. This policy turned out to be, in fact, the reintroduction of the russification policy. The reintroduction of this policy can be explained by Khrushchev's promise of communism in 20 years; the unification of Soviet nationalities would take place, according to Vladimir Lenin, when the Soviet Union reached the final stage of communism, also the final stage of human development. Some all-Union Soviet officials were calling for the abolition of the "pseudosovereign" Soviet republics, and the establishment of one nationality. Instead of introducing the ideologic concept of the Soviet Nation, Brezhnev at the 24th Party Congress talked about "a new historical community of people – the Soviet people", and introduced the ideological tenant of Developed socialism, which postponed communism. When Brezhnev died in 1982, his position of General Secretary of the Communist Party of the Soviet Union was succeeded by Yuri Andropov, who died quickly after taking power. Andropov was succeeded by Konstantin Chernenko, who ruled for little more than a year. Chernenko was succeeded by Mikhail Gorbachev in 1985.

Gorbachev and dissolution: 1985–1991 

Gorbachev's policies of perestroika and glasnost (English: restructuring and openness) failed to reach Ukraine as early as other Soviet republics because of Volodymyr Shcherbytsky, a conservative communist appointed by Brezhnev and the First Secretary of the Ukrainian Communist Party, who resigned from his post in 1989. The Chernobyl disaster of 1986, the russification policies, and the apparent social and economic stagnation led several Ukrainians to oppose Soviet rule. Gorbachev's policy of perestroika was also never introduced into practice, 95 percent of industry and agriculture was still owned by the Soviet state in 1990. The talk of reform, but the lack of introducing reform into practice, led to confusion which in turn evolved into opposition to the Soviet state itself. The policy of glasnost, which ended state censorship, led the Ukrainian diaspora to reconnect with their compatriots in Ukraine, the revitalisation of religious practices by destroying the monopoly of the Russian Orthodox Church and led to the establishment of several opposition pamphlets, journals and newspapers.

Following the failed August Coup in Moscow on 19–21 August 1991, the Supreme Soviet of Ukraine declared independence on 24 August 1991, which renamed the Ukrainian Soviet Socialist Republic to Ukraine. The result of the 1991 independence referendum held on 1 December 1991 proved to be a surprise. An overwhelming majority, 92.3%, voted for independence. The referendum carried in the majority of all oblasts. Notably, the Crimea, which had originally been a territory of the RSFSR until 1954, supported the referendum by a 54 percent majority. Over 80 percent of the population of Eastern Ukraine voted for independence. Ukraine's independence was almost immediately recognized by the international community. Ukraine's new-found independence was the first time in the 20th century that Ukrainian independence had been attempted without either foreign intervention or civil war. In the 1991 Ukrainian presidential election 62 percent of Ukrainians voted for Leonid Kravchuk, who had been vested with presidential powers since the Supreme Soviet's declaration of independence. The secession of the second most powerful republic in the Soviet Union ended any realistic chance of the Soviet Union staying together even on a limited scale.

A week after Kravchuk's victory, on 8 December, he and his Russian and Belarusian counterparts signed the Belovezh Accords, which declared that the Soviet Union had effectively ceased to exist and forming the Commonwealth of Independent States as a replacement. They were joined by eight of the remaining 12 republics (all except Georgia) on 21 December in signing the Alma-Ata Protocol, which reiterated that the Soviet Union had ceased to exist. The Soviet Union formally dissolved on 26 December.

Politics and government 

The Ukrainian SSR's system of government was based on a one-party communist system ruled by the Communist Party of Ukraine, a branch of the Communist Party of Soviet Union (KPSS). The republic was one of 15 constituent republics composing the Soviet Union from its entry into the union in 1922 until its dissolution in 1991. All of the political power and authority in the USSR was in the hands of Communist Party authorities, with little real power being concentrated in official government bodies and organs. In such a system, lower-level authorities directly reported to higher level authorities and so on, with the bulk of the power being held at the highest echelons of the Communist Party.

Originally, the legislative authority was vested in the Congress of Soviets of Ukraine, whose Central Executive Committee was for many years headed by Grigory Petrovsky. Soon after publishing a Stalinist constitution, the Congress of Soviets was transformed into the Supreme Soviet (and the Central Executive Committee into its Presidium), which consisted of 450 deputies. The Supreme Soviet had the authority to enact legislation, amend the constitution, adopt new administrative and territorial boundaries, adopt the budget, and establish political and economic development plans. In addition, parliament also had to authority to elect the republic's executive branch, the Council of Ministers as well as the power to appoint judges to the Supreme Court. Legislative sessions were short and were conducted for only a few weeks out of the year. In spite of this, the Supreme Soviet elected the Presidium, the Chairman, 3 deputy chairmen, a secretary, and couple of other government members to carry out the official functions and duties in between legislative sessions. Chairman of the Presidium was a powerful position in the republic's higher echelons of power, and could nominally be considered the equivalent of head of state, although most executive authority would be concentrated in the Communist Party's politburo and its First Secretary.

Full universal suffrage was granted for all eligible citizens aged 18 and over, excluding prisoners and those deprived of freedom. Although they could not be considered free and were of a symbolic nature, elections to the Supreme Soviet were contested every five years. Nominees from electoral districts from around the republic, typically consisting of an average of 110,000 inhabitants, were directly chosen by party authorities, providing little opportunity for political change, since all political authority was directly subordinate to the higher level above it.

With the beginning of Soviet General Secretary Mikhail Gorbachev's perestroika reforms towards the mid-late 1980s, electoral reform laws were passed in 1989, liberalising the nominating procedures and allowing multiple candidates to stand for election in a district. Accordingly, the first relatively free elections in the Ukrainian SSR were contested in March 1990. 111 deputies from the Democratic Bloc, a loose association of small pro-Ukrainian and pro-sovereignty parties and the instrumental People's Movement of Ukraine (colloquially known as Rukh in Ukrainian) were elected to the parliament. Although the Communist Party retained its majority with 331 deputies, large support for the Democratic Bloc demonstrated the people's distrust of the Communist authorities, which would eventually boil down to Ukrainian independence in 1991.

Ukraine is the legal successor of the Ukrainian SSR and it stated to fulfill "those rights and duties pursuant to international agreements of Union SSR which do not contradict the Constitution of Ukraine and interests of the Republic" on 5 October 1991. After Ukrainian independence the Ukrainian SSR's parliament was changed from Supreme Soviet to its current name Verkhovna Rada, the Verkhovna Rada is still Ukraine's parliament. Ukraine also has refused to recognize exclusive Russian claims to succession of the Soviet Union and claimed such status for Ukraine as well, which was stated in Articles 7 and 8 of On Legal Succession of Ukraine, issued in 1991. Following independence, Ukraine has continued to pursue claims against the Russian Federation in foreign courts, seeking to recover its share of the foreign property that was owned by the Soviet Union. It also retained its seat in the United Nations, held since 1945.

Foreign relations 

On the international front, the Ukrainian SSR, along with the rest of the 15 republics, had virtually no say in their own foreign affairs. It is, however, important to note that in 1944 the Ukrainian SSR was permitted to establish bilateral relations with countries and maintain its own standing army. This clause was used to permit the republic's membership in the United Nations, alongside the Belorussian SSR. Accordingly, representatives from the "Ukrainian Soviet Socialist Republic" and 50 other nations founded the UN on 24 October 1945. In effect, this provided the Soviet Union (a permanent Security Council member with veto powers) with another two votes in the General Assembly. The latter aspect of the 1944 clauses, however, was never fulfilled and the republic's defense matters were managed by the Soviet Armed Forces and the Defense Ministry. Another right that was granted but never used until 1991 was the right of the Soviet republics to secede from the union, which was codified in each of the Soviet constitutions. Accordingly, Article 69 of the Constitution of the Ukrainian SSR stated: "The Ukrainian SSR retains the right to willfully secede from the USSR." However, a republic's theoretical secession from the union was virtually impossible and unrealistic in many ways until after Gorbachev's perestroika reforms.

The Ukrainian SSR was a member of the UN Economic and Social Council, UNICEF, International Labour Organization, Universal Postal Union, World Health Organization, UNESCO, International Telecommunication Union, United Nations Economic Commission for Europe, World Intellectual Property Organization and the International Atomic Energy Agency. It was not separately a member of the Warsaw Pact, Comecon, the World Federation of Trade Unions and the World Federation of Democratic Youth, and since 1949, the International Olympic Committee.

Administrative divisions 

Legally, the Soviet Union and its fifteen union republics constituted a federal system, but the country was functionally a highly centralised state, with all major decision-making taking place in the Kremlin, the capital and seat of government of the country. The constituent republics were essentially unitary states, with lower levels of power being directly subordinate to higher ones. Throughout its 72-year existence, the administrative divisions of the Ukrainian SSR changed numerous times, often incorporating regional reorganisation and annexation on the part of Soviet authorities during World War II.

The most common administrative division was the oblast (province), of which there were 25 upon the republic's independence from the Soviet Union in 1991. Provinces were further subdivided into raions (districts) which numbered 490. The rest of the administrative division within the provinces consisted of cities, urban-type settlements, and villages. Cities in the Ukrainian SSR were a separate exception, which could either be subordinate to either the provincial authorities themselves or the district authorities of which they were the administrative center. Two cities, the capital Kiev, and Sevastopol in Crimea, treated separately because it housed an underground nuclear submarine base, were designated "cities with special status." This meant that they were directly subordinate to the central Ukrainian SSR authorities and not the provincial authorities surrounding them.

Historical formation 

However, the history of administrative divisions in the republic was not so clear cut. At the end of World War I in 1918, Ukraine was invaded by Soviet Russia as the Russian puppet government of the Ukrainian SSR and without official declaration it ignited the Ukrainian–Soviet War. Government of the Ukrainian SSR from very start was managed by the Communist Party of Ukraine that was created in Moscow and was originally formed out of the Bolshevik organisational centers in Ukraine. Occupying the eastern city of Kharkov, the Soviet forces chose it as the republic's seat of government, colloquially named in the media as "Kharkov – Pervaya Stolitsa (the first capital)" with implication to the era of Soviet regime. Kharkov was also the city where the first Soviet Ukrainian government was created in 1917 with strong support from Russian SFSR authorities. However, in 1934, the capital was moved from Kharkov to Kiev, which remains the capital of Ukraine today.

During the 1930s, there were significant numbers of ethnic minorities living within the Ukrainian SSR. National Districts were formed as separate territorial-administrative units within higher-level provincial authorities. Districts were established for the republic's three largest minority groups, which were the Jews, Russians, and Poles. Other ethnic groups, however, were allowed to petition the government for their own national autonomy. In 1924 on the territory of Ukrainian SSR was formed the Moldavian Autonomous Soviet Socialist Republic. Upon the 1940 conquest of Bessarabia and Bukovina by Soviet troops the Moldavian ASSR was passed to the newly formed Moldavian Soviet Socialist Republic, while Budzhak and Bukovina were secured by the Ukrainian SSR. Following the creation of the Ukrainian SSR significant numbers of ethnic Ukrainians found themselves living outside the Ukrainian SSR. In 1920s the Ukrainian SSR was forced to cede several territories to Russia in Severia, Sloboda Ukraine and Azov littoral including such cities like Belgorod, Taganrog and Starodub. In the 1920s the administration of the Ukrainian SSR insisted in vain on reviewing the border between the Ukrainian Soviet Republics and the Russian Soviet Republic based on the 1926 First All-Union Census of the Soviet Union that showed that 4.5 millions of Ukrainians were living on Russian territories bordering Ukraine. A forced end to Ukrainisation in southern Russian Soviet Republic led to a massive decline of reported Ukrainians in these regions in the 1937 Soviet Census.

Upon signing of the Molotov–Ribbentrop Pact, Nazi Germany and Soviet Union partitioned Poland and its Eastern Borderlands were secured by the Soviet buffer republics with Ukraine securing the territory of Eastern Galicia. The Soviet September Polish campaign in Soviet propaganda was portrayed as the Golden September for Ukrainians, given the unification of Ukrainian lands on both banks of Zbruch River, until then the border between the Soviet Union and the Polish communities inhabited by Ukrainian speaking families.

Economy

Before 1945

After 1945

Agriculture 
In 1945, agricultural production stood at only 40 percent of the 1940 level, even though the republic's territorial expansion had "increased the amount of arable land". In contrast to the remarkable growth in the industrial sector, agriculture continued in Ukraine, as in the rest of the Soviet Union, to function as the economy's Achilles heel. Despite the human toll of Collectivisation of agriculture in the Soviet Union, especially in Ukraine, Soviet planners still believed in the effectiveness of collective farming. The old system was reestablished; the numbers of collective farms in Ukraine increased from 28 thousand in 1940 to 33 thousand in 1949, comprising 45 million hectares; the numbers of state farms barely increased, standing at 935 in 1950, comprising 12.1 million hectares. By the end of the Fourth Five-Year Plan (in 1950) and the Fifth Five-Year Plan (in 1955), agricultural output still stood far lower than the 1940 level. The slow changes in agriculture can be explained by the low productivity in collective farms, and by bad weather-conditions, which the Soviet planning system could not effectively respond to. Grain for human consumption in the post-war years decreased, this in turn led to frequent and severe food shortages.

The increase of Soviet agricultural production was tremendous, however, the Soviet-Ukrainians still experienced food shortages due to the inefficiencies of a highly centralised economy. During the peak of Soviet-Ukrainian agriculture output in the 1950s and early-to-mid-1960s, human consumption in Ukraine, and in the rest of the Soviet Union, actually experienced short intervals of decrease. There are many reasons for this inefficiency, but its origins can be traced back to the single-purchaser and -producer market system set up by Joseph Stalin. Khrushchev tried to improve the agricultural situation in the Soviet Union by expanding the total crop size – for instance, in the Ukrainian SSR alone "the amount of land planted with corn grew by 600 percent". At the height of this policy, between 1959 and 1963, one-third of Ukrainian arable land grew this crop. This policy decreased the total production of wheat and rye; Khrushchev had anticipated this, and the production of wheat and rye moved to Soviet Central Asia as part of the Virgin Lands Campaign. Khrushchev's agricultural policy failed, and in 1963 the Soviet Union had to import food from abroad. The total level of agricultural productivity in Ukraine decreased sharply during this period, but recovered in the 1970s and 1980s during Leonid Brezhnev's rule.

Industry 
During the post-war years, Ukraine's industrial productivity doubled its pre-war level. In 1945 industrial output totalled only 26 percent of the 1940 level. The Soviet Union introduced the Fourth Five-Year Plan in 1946. The Fourth Five-Year Plan would prove to be a remarkable success, and can be likened to the "wonders of West German and Japanese reconstruction", but without foreign capital; the Soviet reconstruction is historically an impressive achievement. In 1950 industrial gross output had already surpassed 1940-levels. While the Soviet régime still emphasised heavy industry over light industry, the light-industry sector also grew. The increase in capital investment and the expansion of the labour force also benefited Ukraine's economic recovery. In the prewar years, 15.9 percent of the Soviet budget went to Ukraine, in 1950, during the Fourth Five-Year Plan this had increased to 19.3 percent. The workforce had increased from 1.2 million in 1945 to 2.9 million in 1955; an increase of 33.2 percent over the 1940-level. The result of this remarkable growth was that by 1955 Ukraine was producing 2.2 times more than in 1940, and the republic had become one of the leading producers of certain commodities in Europe. Ukraine was the largest per-capita producer in Europe of pig iron and sugar, and the second-largest per-capita producer of steel and of iron ore, and was the third largest per-capita producer of coal in Europe.

From 1965 until the dissolution of the Soviet Union in 1991, industrial growth in Ukraine decreased, and by the 1970s it started to stagnate. Significant economic decline did not become apparent before the 1970s. During the Fifth Five-Year Plan (1951–1955), industrial development in Ukraine grew by 13.5 percent, while during the Eleventh Five-Year Plan (1981–1985) industry grew by a relatively modest 3.5 percent. The double-digit growth seen in all branches of the economy in the post-war years had disappeared by the 1980s, entirely replaced by low growth-figures. An ongoing problem throughout the republic's existence was the planners' emphasis on heavy industry over consumer goods.

The urbanisation of Ukrainian society in the post-war years led to an increase in energy consumption. Between 1956 and 1972, to meet this increasing demand, the government built five water reservoirs along the Dnieper River. Aside from improving Soviet-Ukrainian water transport, the reservoirs became the sites for new power stations, and hydroelectric energy flourished in Ukraine in consequence. The natural-gas industry flourished as well, and Ukraine became the site of the first post-war production of gas in the Soviet Union; by the 1960s Ukraine's biggest gas field was producing 30 percent of the USSR's total gas production. The government was not able to meet the people's ever-increasing demand for energy consumption, but by the 1970s, the Soviet government had conceived an intensive nuclear power program. According to the Eleventh Five-Year Plan, the Soviet government would build 8 nuclear power plants in Ukraine by 1989. As a result of these efforts, Ukraine became highly diversified in energy consumption.

Religion 

Many churches and synagogues were destroyed during the existence of the Ukrainian SSR.

Urbanization 

Urbanisation in post-Stalin Ukraine grew quickly; in 1959 only 25 cities in Ukraine had populations over one hundred thousand, by 1979 the number had grown to 49. During the same period, the growth of cities with a population over one million increased from one to five; Kiev alone nearly doubled its population, from 1.1 million in 1959 to 2.1 million in 1979. This proved a turning point in Ukrainian society: for the first time in Ukraine's history, the majority of ethnic Ukrainians lived in urban areas; 53 percent of the ethnic Ukrainian population did so in 1979. The majority worked in the non-agricultural sector, in 1970 31 percent of Ukrainians engaged in agriculture, in contrast, 63 percent of Ukrainians were industrial workers and white-collar staff. In 1959, 37 percent of Ukrainians lived in urban areas, in 1989 the proportion had increased to 60 percent.

Notes

References

Citations

Sources 

 Adams, Arthur E. Bolsheviks in the Ukraine: The Second Campaign, 1918–1919 (New Haven & London: Yale University Press, 1963).
 Armstrong, John A. The Soviet Bureaucratic Elite: A Case Study of the Ukrainian Apparatus (New York: Praeger, 1959).
 Dmytryshyn, Basil. Moscow and the Ukraine, 1918–1953: A Study of Russian Bolshevik Nationality Policy (New York: Bookman Associates, 1956).
 
 
  
 Manning, Clarence A. Ukraine under the Soviets (New York: Bookman Associates, 1953).
 
 Sullivant, Robert S. Soviet Politics and the Ukraine, 1917–1957 (New York: Columbia University Press, 1962).

Further reading

External links 

 
 

 
Republics of the Soviet Union
Communism in Ukraine
Former socialist republics

Modern history of Ukraine

Post–Russian Empire states
Russian Revolution in Ukraine
Russian-speaking countries and territories

States and territories established in 1919
States and territories disestablished in 1991
20th century in Ukraine
Soviet Union–Ukraine relations
Former member states of the United Nations